The Professional Footballers' Association Men's Players' Player of the Year (often called the PFA Men's Players' Player of the Year, the Players' Player of the Year, or simply the Player of the Year) is an annual award given to the player who is adjudged to have been the best of the year in English football.  The award has been presented since the 1973–74 season and the winner is chosen by a vote amongst the members of the players' trade union, the Professional Footballers' Association (PFA). The current holder is Mohamed Salah of Liverpool, who won the award for a second time on 9 June 2022.

The first winner of the award was Leeds United defender Norman Hunter. As of 2022, only Mark Hughes, Alan Shearer, Thierry Henry, Cristiano Ronaldo, Gareth Bale, Kevin De Bruyne and Mohamed Salah have won the award on two occasions, and only Henry, Ronaldo and De Bruyne have won the award in consecutive seasons. Of the seven, only Shearer won his two awards playing for different teams.  Although there is a separate PFA Young Player of the Year award, young players remain eligible to win the senior award, and on three occasions the same player has won both awards for a season, Andy Gray in 1976–77, Ronaldo in 2006–07 and Bale in 2012–13. Only three non-European players have won the award: Luis Suárez (Uruguay) in 2013–14, Riyad Mahrez (Algeria) in 2015–16, and Mohamed Salah (Egypt) in 2017–18 and 2021–22.

Every spring, each member of the association votes for two players. A shortlist of nominees is published in April and the winner of the award, along with the winners of the PFA's other annual awards, is announced at a gala event in London.  The award is regarded by the players themselves as extremely prestigious, with Teddy Sheringham describing it in 2001 as "the biggest personal award you can get in the game", and John Terry stating in 2005 that he considered it "the ultimate accolade to be voted for by your fellow professionals whom you play against week-in and week-out".

Winners
The award has been presented on 49 occasions as of 2022, with 42 different winners.  The table also indicates where the winning player also won one or more of the other major "player of the year" awards in English football, namely the Football Writers' Association's Footballer of the Year award (FWA), the PFA Fans' Player of the Year award (FPY), the PFA Young Player of the Year award (YPY), the Premier League Player of the Season award (PPS), and the Football Supporters’ Federation Player of the Year award (FSF).

Breakdown of winners

By country

By club

See also
Premier League Player of the Season
FWA Footballer of the Year

References

External links
The official website of the Professional Footballers' Association

English football trophies and awards
England 1
Awards established in 1974
1974 establishments in England
Annual events in England
Annual sporting events in the United Kingdom